Francis Taylor may refer to:

Francis Taylor, Baron Taylor of Hadfield (1905–1995), founder of the housebuilder Taylor Woodrow
Francis Taylor (cricketer) (1890–1963), Derbyshire cricketer
Francis Taylor (martyr) (died 1621), former Lord Mayor of Dublin, martyred 1621
Francis Taylor (Liberal Unionist politician) (1845–1915), English Liberal Unionist MP for South Norfolk, 1885–1898
Francis Henry Taylor (1903–1957), American museum director and curator
Francis Lenn Taylor (1897–1968), American art dealer, father of actress Elizabeth Taylor
Francis Pringle Taylor (1847–1913), UK naval officer, active in colonial Australia
Francis X. Taylor, former ambassador-at-large for the U.S. Department of State; appointed by George W. Bush to the Privacy and Civil Liberties Oversight Board
Francis Taylor, 1st Baron Maenan (1854–1951), English barrister and judge
Frankie Taylor (born 1942), British Olympic boxer

See also
Frank Taylor (disambiguation)